Terminalia hadleyana is a tree of the family Combretaceae native to northern Australia.

It blooms between October and December producing cream-yellow flowers.

Subspecies
Subspecies include:
 Terminalia hadleyana subsp. carpentariae  — wild peach
 Terminalia hadleyana subsp. hadleyana

The range of T. h. subsp. hadleyana extends through the top end of the Northern Territory to the south eastern extremity of the Gulf of Carpentaria in Queensland and is often part of open woodland communities. In Western Australia it is confined to rocky outcrops and on floodplains in the Kimberley growing in sandy-clay soils over sandstone or limestone.

The edible fruits of T. h. subsp. carpentariae are harvested in the wild. The species was formally described as Terminalia carpentariae in 1950 by botanist Cyril Tenison White. The type specimen was collected in the Crocodile Islands in the Northern Territory. This subspecies is native to northern Australia, occurring on sandy soils and coastal dunes.

References

Trees of Australia
Rosids of Western Australia
Flora of Queensland
Flora of the Northern Territory
Plants described in 1918
hadleyana